Antonio Pérez, O.S.B. (2 May 1562 – 1 May 1637) was a Roman Catholic prelate who served as Archbishop of Tarragona (1633–1637), Bishop of Lérida (1633),  and Bishop of Urgell (1627–1633).

Biography
He was born in Santo Domingo de Silos, Spain on 2 May 1562 and ordained a priest in the Order of Saint Benedict.
On 17 May 1627, he was appointed during the papacy of Pope Urban VIII as Bishop of Urgell.
On 23 August 1627, he was consecrated bishop by Antonio Zapata y Cisneros, Cardinal-Priest of Santa Balbina. 
On 21 February 1633, he was appointed during the papacy of Pope Urban VIII as Bishop of Lérida.
On 28 November 1633, he was appointed during the papacy of Pope Urban VIII as Archbishop of Tarragona.
He served as Archbishop of Tarragona until his death on 1 May 1637.

While bishop, he was the principal co-consecrator of Gonzalo Chacón Velasco y Fajardo, Bishop of Calahorra y La Calzada (1633).

References

External links and additional sources
 (for Chronology of Bishops) 
 (for Chronology of Bishops) 
 (for Chronology of Bishops)
 (for Chronology of Bishops)
 (for Chronology of Bishops)
 (for Chronology of Bishops)

17th-century Roman Catholic bishops in Spain
Bishops appointed by Pope Urban VIII
1562 births
1637 deaths
Benedictine bishops
Archbishops of Tarragona
Bishops of Lleida